Jussi-Pekka Savolainen (born 25 June 1986) is a Finnish footballer who plays for Pallo-Iirot.

Career
33 games, no goals. Tampere United, Finland (Veikkausliiga, 2004–2007)
Won two Finnish Championships with Tampere United (2006 and 2007)
Pallo-Iirot, Finland (Juniors)
37 caps for Finnish boys national football team

International
Savolainen is a left-sided attacking midfield player. He represented Finland at under-17 level and played for them in the 2003 FIFA U-17 World Championship, which were held in Finland.

References

1986 births
Living people
People from Rauma, Finland
Finnish footballers
Tampere United players
Kuopion Palloseura players
Vaasan Palloseura players
Veikkausliiga players
Association football midfielders
Sportspeople from Satakunta